Global Fund for Children (GFC) is a Washington, DC-based nonprofit organization whose mission is to transform the lives of the world's most vulnerable children. GFC pursues this mission by making small grants to innovative community-based organizations that provide services and programs for children that government and large aid organizations often do not reach.

History
Global Fund for Children was established in 1994 and made its first grants with the royalties from its children's book publishing venture. Since then, GFC's grantmaking capacity has grown dramatically. To date, GFC has awarded over $40 million in grants to more than 600 organizations in 80 countries, serving more than 9 million children worldwide.

In 2003 the fund became one of the early sponsors of solar-powered floating schools in Bangladesh. The project has been recognized as one of the most innovative educational projects in the world.

In 2006 GFC, American Jewish World Service, EMPower-The Emerging Markets Foundation, Firelight Foundation, Global Fund for Women and Mama Cash joined forces with the Nike Foundation to establish the Grassroots Girls Initiative (GGI). GGI was the first donor consortium devoted exclusively to grassroots solutions for adolescent girls.

In 2007 GFC launched its Under-8 Initiative (U8), a pledge to invest $10 million over five years in groups working with children under the age of eight in developing countries in Asia, Africa and Latin America. The initiative was sponsored by the Clinton Foundation as part of the Clinton Global Initiative. Within the first year of operation it reached an estimated 47,000 children in 19 countries and awarded a total of $487,300 in grants.

In 2008, Global Fund for Children was selected as a winner of the John D. and Catherine T. MacArthur Foundation's Digital Media and Learning Competition. GFC's project, "Using Digital Technology to Extend Grassroots Knowledge", works to enable the organization to share and promote the knowledge and best practices of its grantee partners.

In 2012, the Financial Times selected Global Fund for Children as its Seasonal Appeal winner. GFC was profiled in a series of online and print articles from November 2012 through January 2013 and as a result raised $4.89 million for GFC programs.

In 2018, GFC launched an anti-trafficking cohort in partnership with a Canadian conglomerate. The approach is to place early stage bets on high-potential social entrepreneurs with an ultimate goal of creating scalable and contextual solutions to prevent trafficking at the root.

Other GFC strategic partnerships include Goldman Sachs, Credit Suisse, Johnson & Johnson, Howard G. Buffett Foundation, Oak Foundation, GoodWeave, Feizy Rugs, and Tea Collection.

Approach
Global Fund for Children uses a venture philanthropy approach  to address issues affecting extremely vulnerable populations of children, including trafficked children, refugees, and child laborers.

GFC strategically invests in grassroots organizations and helps them to grow and become sustainable resources in their communities. The organization intentionally scouts out and supports small, emerging nonprofits that do not have other sources of funding—in 2013, GFC was the first US-based institutional funder for 83 percent of its new grantees. On average, GFC's grantee partners grow threefold in size and reach during their partnership with GFC, expanding their capacity to reach more children in need.

In a 2014 survey of GFC grantee partners, 91 percent of respondents agreed that GFC stands apart from other funders because GFC contributes to its partners' long-term sustainability.

Children's books

Global Fund for Children books aim to integrate children's perspectives and inspire young readers to explore diverse cultures and global understanding. The GFC book collection includes more than 30 full-color books for children from infancy to adolescence. Proceeds from book purchases help support GFC programs.

Films

Global Fund for Children has invested in two documentary films:

War Child, a 2008 documentary about former Sudanese child soldier Emmanuel Jal, won the audience choice award at the Tribeca film festival.

Journey of a Red Fridge tells the story of Hari Rai, a child porter who carries a red Coca-Cola refrigerator through the Himalayan mountains. Filmed by Lunam Docs, a Serbian independent documentary production duo – Lucian and Natasa Muntean – who specialize in telling the stories of child laborers.

References

External links
 Official GFC Website

Non-profit organizations based in Washington, D.C.
Organizations established in 1994
Children's rights organizations in the United States